Gangzur Gewog (Dzongkha: སྒང་ཟུར་) is a gewog (village block) of Lhuntse District, Bhutan.

References 

Gewogs of Bhutan
Lhuntse District